The North American Bengali Conference (NABC) is an annual Bengali culture conference held in the United States and Canada, typically around the weekend of July 4. It was established in 1981 by the Cultural Association of Bengal in New York, and is hosted by a different organization every year. The conference includes performances, readings, discussion, networking, and class reunions.

Performers are often from the United States, Canada, Bangladesh, and India. Audiences are primarily Bangladeshi American, Indian American, Bangladeshi Canadian and Indian Canadian.

Venues 
 1981: New York City, New York Organized By Cultural Association of Bengal 
 1982: New York City Organized By Cultural Association of Bengal 
 1983: New York City Organized By Cultural Association of Bengal 
 1984: Boston, Massachusetts Organized By Prabasi of New England 
 1985: Baltimore, Maryland Organized By Prantik of Baltimore 
 1986: Cleveland, Ohio Organized By Bengali Cultural Society, Cleveland Ohio 
 1987: San Francisco/San Jose, Bay Area Auditorium at the California School for the Deaf, Fremont, California Organized By Bay Area Prabasi
 1988: Atlantic City, New Jersey, Jim Whelan Boardwalk Hall organized by Kallol NJ
 1989: New York City Organized By Cultural Association of Bengal 
 1990: Maryland, University of Maryland Organized By Sanskriti DC
 1991  Boston area, Lowell, Massachusetts Organized By Prabasi Of New England 
 1992: Toronto, Ontario, Canada Organized By PBCA Toronto 
 1993: Los Angeles, California, California State University, Fullerton Organized By Dakshini Los Angeles 
 1994: Chicago, Illinois, Hyatt Regency O'Hare Organized By Bengali Association of Greater Chicago (BAGC)
 1995: New York Metro Area, White Plains, New York Organized By Cultural Association of Bengal 
 1996: Houston, Texas, Adam's Mark Hotel Organized By Tagore Society of Houston 
 1997: Philadelphia, Pennsylvania Valley Forge Convention Center, King of Prussia, Pennsylvania Organized By Pragati Philadelphia 
 1998: Toronto, Regal Constellation Organized By PBCA Toronto 
 1999: San Francisco Bay Area, Santa Clara Convention Center, Santa Clara, California Organized By Bay Area Prabasi 
 2000: Atlantic City, New Jersey, Atlantic City Convention Center and Kolkata, India Organized By Kallol NJ and others
 2001: Boston, Paul Tsongas Arena Lowell MA organized by Prabasi of New England 
 2002: Atlanta, Georgia World Congress Center Organized By South Eastern Bengali Association 
 2003: Long Beach, CA, Long Beach Convention Center Organized by Dakshini Bengali Association of California 
 2004: Baltimore, Baltimore Convention Center Organized By Sanskriti DC
 2005: New York City, Madison Square Garden Organized By Cultural Association of Bengal 
 2006: Houston, George R. Brown Convention Center Organized By Tagore Society of Houston 
 2007: Detroit, Cobo Conference/Exhibition Hall/ TCF Center Organized By Bengali Association of Greater Michigan 
 2008: Toronto, Metro Toronto Convention Centre Organized By PBCA Toronto
 2009: San Jose, McEnery Convention Center Organized By Bay Area Prabasi 
 2010: Atlantic City, Atlantic City Convention Center Organized By Kallol of NJ
 2011: Baltimore, Baltimore Convention Center Organized By Sanskriti DC
 2012: Las Vegas, Paris Las Vegas Organized By Cultural Association of Bengal 
 2013: Toronto, Ontario, Canada, Metro Toronto Convention Centre Organized By PBCA Toronto
 2014: Orlando, Florida, USA, The Peabody Orlando Organized By Bengali Society of Florida
 2015: Houston, Texas, USA, George R. Brown Convention Center Organized By Tagore Society of Houston 
 2016: New York City, Madison Square Garden  Organized By Cultural Association of Bengal 
 2017: San Francisco, Santa Clara Convention Center Organized By Bay Area Prabasi
 2018: Atlantic City, Atlantic City Convention Center Organized By Ananda Mandir NJ
2019: Baltimore, Baltimore Convention Center Organized By Sanskriti DC
2020: In person NABC canceled due to COVID-19. online philanthropic initiative HOPE 2020 organized by the Cultural Association of Bengal 
2021: in person Banga Sammelan canceled, online NABC named NABC GLOBAL was organized by the Cultural Association of Bengal on virtual reality (VR) platform
2022: Las Vegas Nevada, Planet Hollywood Casino & Resort & Zappos Theater Las Vegas Organized by Cultural Association of Bengal
2023: Atlantic City, Jim Whelan Boardwalk Hall Organized by KPC Bengali Hall of Fame Edison NJ
2024: Chicago Illinois, Renaissance Schaumburg Convention Center Organized By Bengali Association of Greater Chicago
2025: Biswa Banga Sammelan organized by Cultural Association of Bengal in Kolkata India

Register for NABC and upcoming NABC Information/Links 
NABC 2023-https://nabc2023.net/, Facebook- https://www.facebook.com/nabc2023

NABC 2024- https://nabc2024.org

NABC Partner Organizations 

 Ananda Mandir NJ
 GSCA NJ
 Kallol NJ 
 BCAA
 BASC
 Dakshini Los Angeles
 Prabasi Bay Area
 Uttoron Seattle 
 Pragati Philadelphia
 Prabasi of New England
 KPC Bengali Hall of Fame
 BSF Florida
 Toronto Kalibari
 Krishti Edmonton
 PBCA Toronto
 BAGC Chicago
 ICC Garden State
 ECDPA NY
 Vedanta Society NY
 Tagore Society of Houston
 RDM NJ
 Bharatiya Kala Kendra NJ
 Paschami Bay Area
 Sanskriti Washington DC
 Prantik of Baltimore
 Sanskriti Bay Area
 Saikat San Diego
 Bengali Association of Nevada
 Bengali Association of Minnesota
 Valley Bengali Community LA
 Ankur Sacramento 
 Bengali Community of Sacramento
 Anandahwini NY 
 BADV Newark
 Dhroopad INC Washington DC
 GSPC, Jersey City
 BCS, South Jersey
 NASKA Connecticut
 Lipilekha NJ
 New York Kali Mandir
 Chicago Kali Bari
 Sreeshti NJ
 Mrittrika NJ
 Udaan Delaware

See also 
 Bengali language
 Bengali people
 World Sylhet Convention

References 

Conventions in the United States
Conventions in Canada
Indian American
Bangladeshi American
Indo-Canadian culture
Bangladeshi Canadian
Indian-American culture
1981 establishments in the United States